Furona degenera is a species of beetle in the family Cerambycidae. It was described by Henry Walter Bates in 1880. It is known from Colombia, Mexico and Panama.

References

Onciderini
Beetles described in 1880